Alexandre Marinkov (born 2 December 1967 in Grenoble) is a French retired footballer.

References

Association football defenders
Living people
French footballers
1967 births
Scarborough F.C. players
Hibernian F.C. players
French expatriate footballers
Expatriate footballers in England
Expatriate footballers in Scotland
French expatriates in England
French expatriates in Scotland
Scottish Football League players
Sportspeople from Grenoble
Footballers from Auvergne-Rhône-Alpes